Samy Abdel Razek (born 10 April 1980) is an Egyptian sport shooter. Abdel Razek represented Egypt at the 2008 Summer Olympics in Beijing, where he competed in the men's 50 m pistol. He finished only in thirty-second place by four points ahead of Portugal's João Costa from the final attempt, for a total score of 549 targets.

He competed at the 2020 Summer Olympics in the men's 10 m air pistol event and the 10 m air pistol mixed team event.

References

External links
 
 

1980 births
Living people
Egyptian male sport shooters
Olympic shooters of Egypt
Shooters at the 2008 Summer Olympics
Shooters at the 2016 Summer Olympics
Shooters at the 2020 Summer Olympics